Disintegrin and metalloproteinase domain-containing protein 20 is an enzyme that in humans is encoded by the ADAM20 gene.  It is a membrane disintegrin-metalloprotease that belongs to the ADAM family. It is exclusively expressed in Testes and is similar to sperm cell-specific fertilins -alpha and -beta.

Its cDNA was mapped, and was found to be tightly linked to marker SHGC-36001 on chromosome 14q24.1. ADAM 20 may be the functional equivalent of fertilin-alpha in humans.

References 

Proteases
Protein families